is a Japanese Drama comedy film directed in 2016 by Daigo Matsui. The Movie featured in the Melbourne International Film Festival.

Plot 
Four girls go on a journey, following their favorite band. The girls make the journey from Fukuoka to Tokyo, to see the band they worship, CreepHyp perform. They record the journey with a handheld camera, the film covers the drama associated with the journey.

Cast 
Sonoko Inoue as Ichinose
Reika Oozeki
Saku Mayama
Toko Miura
CreepHyp
Sosuke Ikematsu

References

External links 
  
 

2016 films
Films directed by Daigo Matsui
Japanese comedy-drama films
2010s Japanese-language films